James "Grim" Desborough is a British game designer, author and blogger who has worked primarily on role-playing games, as well as card games, board games and social computer games.

Career
James Desborough wrote The Munchkin's Guide to Powergaming in 2000/2001, winning an Origins Award for that work along with his co-authors Steve Mortimer and Phil Masters. Desborough was a co-author of CS1: Cannibal Sector One he also briefly worked as the line editor for SLA Industries. Desborough is also the owner of Postmortem Studios. Postmortem Studios was one of Cubicle 7's first company partnerships due to Desborough's connections with Angus Abranson. He later became creative director at Chronicle City, Abranson's new venture but this partnership ended in July 2021.

In 2017 he released a licensed role-playing game based on John Norman's fantasy series Gor, which also included art by Michael Manning.

Desborough's work was included in Red Phone Box, and in The Mammoth Book of Erotic Romance and Domination. He also self-publishes.

His D&D design work includes Monster Manual V (2007) and City of Stormreach (2008).

Desborough's career has often been characterised by humour and adult content, leading to his role as Games Master for the adult stream 'Tabletopless'. While the stream primarily plays Dungeons and Dragons they have also played Cyberpunk, The Witcher and others.

Desborough is the author of a self-published August 2017 book which claimed that Gamergate was "a genuinely important battle in the ongoing culture war" and portrayed it as a necessary "social revolt" against a new Satanic Panic, rather than as a harassment campaign. In the book's introduction, Desborough writes that his distress regarding opposition and harassment related to Gamergate, as well as a sense of betrayal led him to attempt suicide in October 2014.

Desborough has appeared as a commentator on men's issues on The Stream on Al Jazeera.

References

External links
 Home page
 

Dungeons & Dragons game designers
Living people
Place of birth missing (living people)
Year of birth missing (living people)